The 1968–69 Swedish Division I season was the 25th season of Swedish Division I. Leksands IF won the league title by finishing first in the final round.

First round

Northern Group

Southern Group

Final round

External links
 1968–69 season

Swedish
Swedish Division I seasons
1968–69 in Swedish ice hockey